Pühamets Nature Reserve is a nature reserve in located in Saare County, Estonia.

The area of the nature reserve is 57 ha.

The protected area was founded in 2007 to protect valuable habitat types and threatened species in Kõljala and Masa village (both in former Pihtla Parish).

References

Nature reserves in Estonia
Geography of Saare County